Serenade to a Bus Seat is an album by American jazz trumpeter Clark Terry featuring tracks recorded in 1957 for the Riverside label.

Reception

Allmusic awarded the album 4 stars stating "This set contains excellent straightahead jazz performed with plenty of spirit".

Track listing
All compositions by Clark Terry except where noted
 "Donna Lee" (Charlie Parker) - 4:04    
 "Boardwalk" - 7:01    
 "Boomerang" - 6:01    
 "Digits" - 4:08    
 "Serenade to a Bus Seat" - 4:37    
 "Stardust" (Hoagy Carmichael, Mitchell Parish) - 5:15    
 "Cruising" - 8:27    
 "That Old Black Magic" (Harold Arlen, Johnny Mercer) - 1:59

Personnel 
Clark Terry - trumpet
Johnny Griffin - tenor saxophone
Wynton Kelly - piano
Paul Chambers - bass
Philly Joe Jones - drums

References 

1957 albums
Clark Terry albums
Albums produced by Orrin Keepnews
Riverside Records albums